Danielle Steel's Star is a 1993 American made-for-television film starring Jennie Garth, Craig Bierko, Terry Farrell, Penny Fuller and Mitchell Ryan. This film is based on the 1989 novel Star by author Danielle Steel and is set in the 1970s. It was directed by Michael Miller and written by Danielle Steel and Claire Labine. Crystal Wyatt's singing voice during the song Timeless Love was performed by Megon McDonough (credited as Megan McDonough).

Plot
Jennie Garth plays Crystal Wyatt, a sweet country girl who dreams of becoming a singer. When her father dies, Crystal's life soon becomes dramatic. After her brother-in-law rapes her in the barn, Crystal immediately tells her mother (who has never really loved her) asking for support, but her mother refuses to believe her.  Crystal confronts her brother-in-law with a shotgun, but in the fight her brother is shot dead. Crystal runs away to San Francisco, where she becomes a waitress and singer. She falls for a charitable lawyer and kind army man, Spencer. They, though he is years older, have had chemistry from the beginning and later begin a passionate relationship in her tumultuous life. Crystal rises up to stardom with her looks and voice and competes with life's circumstances to be with the man she adores. However, Spencer is to be engaged with a woman named Elizabeth, a socialite who wants her life to be perfect and ordered. As Crystal's life winds down, Spencer's marriage and patience dwindles. Eventually, Crystal becomes pregnant and moves in with her childhood friend (played by Bryan Smith) with Spencer's child, but wants to let him get his life in order before they can be together. Eventually, he quits his associations with the higher-ups, quits his marriage, and goes back to Crystal, where he discovers her with his 5-year-old son, Zeb. The movie ends on a happy note, even with much history been had, and it is assumed that they live the rest of their lives out in a storybook romance.

Cast
 Jennie Garth as Crystal Wyatt
 Craig Bierko as Spencer Hill
 Terry Farrell as Elizabeth
 Penny Fuller as Olivia Wyatt
 Roxanne Reese as Pearl
 Mitchell Ryan as Harrison Barclay
 Jim Haynie as Tad Wyatt 
 Melendy Britt as Priscilla Barclay

References

External links

1993 television films
1990s crime drama films
1993 romantic drama films
1993 films
American crime drama films
American romantic drama films
Films based on American novels
Films based on romance novels
Films set in the 1970s
NBC Productions films
NBC network original films
Films based on works by Danielle Steel
Films scored by Lee Holdridge
American drama television films
Films directed by Michael Miller (director)
1990s English-language films
1990s American films